Yilgarn-Coolgardie was an electoral district of the Legislative Assembly in the Australian state of Western Australia from 1930 to 1950. Located in the Goldfields region, the district was an amalgamation of the former districts of Yilgarn and Coolgardie. Created for the 1930 state election, its first member was Edwin Corboy of the Labor Party, previously the member for Yilgarn. He was succeeded at the 1933 state election by George Lambert, also of the Labor Party, who had been the last member for Coolgardie. Yilgarn-Coolgardie was abolished at the 1950 state election. Incumbent member Lionel Kelly then transferred to the new seat of Merredin-Yilgarn.

Members for Yilgarn-Coolgardie

Election results

Yilgarn-Coolgardie
Coolgardie, Western Australia
1930 establishments in Australia
1950 disestablishments in Australia
Constituencies established in 1930
Constituencies disestablished in 1950